Yes, We Have No Bonanza is a 1939 short subject directed by Del Lord starring American slapstick comedy team The Three Stooges (Moe Howard, Larry Fine and Curly Howard). It is the 39th entry in the series released by Columbia Pictures starring the comedians, who released 190 shorts for the studio between 1934 and 1959.

Plot
The Stooges are singing waiters in a saloon out West, accompanied by three cowgirls. Unfortunately, saloon keeper Maxey (Dick Curtis) is surly and patronizing to the hard working girls. The girls have little choice, as they are forced to work for him because their father is in debt. The Stooges vow to make enough money to pay off the debt and wed the girls, and decide to go prospecting for gold.

Unknown to the Stooges, however, Maxey has recently robbed a bank and buried the loot. Before they find the stolen treasure with the stocks and gold bonds, the Stooges have a mishap, when a rock hits Curly, and thinking that it was Moe's doing, throws a rock at Moe, causing Moe to throw a stick of dynamite, which lands near Yorick, the burro. When their dog takes the stick of dynamite and puts it into the box of canned food supplies, Moe thinks that Yorick ate the dynamite and tries to have the burro drink from a bucket of water, before the explosion. In their digging, the boys managed to discover Maxey's stash, thinking they are truly in the dough. They return to town, but Maxey gets his hands on the money and flees the saloon. The Stooges, of course, catch up with Maxey, retrieve the loot, and end up in a Sherriff's office, where he recognizes the stolen money from the First National Bank, giving back to the bank from whence it came, much to their astonishment.

Production notes
Filming for Yes, We Have No Bonanza commenced between November 28 and December 1, 1938. The film's title is a parody of the 1923 song "Yes! We Have No Bananas".

After the dynamite explodes, and thinking that the burro perished in the explosion, Moe misquotes the famous Shakespeare line from "hamlet", the words: "Alas, Poor Yorrick, I knew him (well)"

Early in the movie, Curly is seen riding to the saloon on an Ingo-Bike.

References

External links 
 
 

1939 films
1939 comedy films
American slapstick comedy films
American black-and-white films
Columbia Pictures short films
Films directed by Del Lord
The Three Stooges films
1930s English-language films
1930s American films